Justice Meyer may refer to:

Bernard S. Meyer, judge of the New York Supreme Court and the New York Court of Appeals
Helen Meyer, associate justice of the Minnesota Supreme Court
Louis B. Meyer, associate justice of the North Carolina Supreme Court